Cleveland High School is a public high school in inner southeast Portland, Oregon, United States. It is part of the Portland Public Schools district.

History

Cleveland High School was established in 1916 as Commercial High School, changing its name to the High School of Commerce in 1917. The school was originally located on what is now the Portland State University campus, but moved to its current location in 1929 and expanded its name to Clinton Kelly High School of Commerce. The 1929 building was designed by the architect George Howell Jones. Cleveland's focus during this period was on students pursuing a business education, so it offered courses in bookkeeping, stenography, and other related business subjects.

The High School of Commerce gradually increased its course offerings, and eventually became a comprehensive high school in the fall of 1948. The school's name was changed to Grover Cleveland High School the same year, and a new athletic field house and science laboratories were added to the school. This expansion was funded by a $25 million building levy passed by the Portland school board in 1947 that was aimed at renovating and expanding schools across Portland in response to the post-war baby boom.

In the late 1970s and early 1980s, the school district faced declining enrollment, and targeted Cleveland for closure. The CHS property was made up of two parcels: the school building site and the athletic field, originally the site of the Clinton Kelly home. Clinton Kelly, an early Portland settler and minister, specified that the property was to be used solely for a public school. If the property was used for any other purpose, or put up for sale, the property would revert to the Kelly estate, and to the living heirs of Clinton Kelly. The school district ultimately decided to close Washington-Monroe High School instead, and keep Cleveland open.

During 1990 and 1991 the school auditorium was equipped with a large theater pipe organ. The instrument was removed from Benson High School near the Lloyd Center, enlarged, and installed in the Cleveland Auditorium by the Oregon Chapter of the American Theatre Organ Society (now called the Columbia River Theatre Organ Society), which maintains it and presents events open to the public.

Cleveland joined the International Baccalaureate program in 2000, and is one of two high schools that offer the program in Portland.

In 2005, Cleveland was the setting for the music video for "16 Military Wives" by local indie rock band The Decemberists.

In April 2019, Cleveland was the site of a controversy involving culinary arts students making a cake resembling blackface. This was four days after a small noose was found hanging in one of Cleveland's entry points and six months after swastikas and other antisemitic graffiti was found on Cleveland's walls and even on a flier advertising Cleveland's Jewish Student Union.

On December 12, 2022, a 16-year-old student was shot and injured partially on school grounds.

Charlotte Plummer Owen worked at the school prior to World War II.

Student profile
In the 2018–2019 school year, Cleveland's student population was 68% European American, 10% Hispanic/Latino, 9% Asian, 3% African American, 1% Native American, 1% Pacific Islander, and 8% mixed race. In 2009–2010, the school was locally known for having "an incredibly vocal, motivated and organized parent community".

In 2008, 85% of the school's seniors received a high school diploma. Of 310 students, 262 graduated, 26 dropped out, nine received a modified diploma, and 13 were still in high school the following year. In 2009, 28% of Cleveland students were transfers into the school.

Athletics
Cleveland competes in the Portland Interscholastic League under 6A classification.

State championships

Girls swimming: 1954, 1955, 1956, 1957
Dance/drill: 1990, 1991, 1996, 1997

Notable alumni

Hazel Ying Lee, first Chinese-American woman to become a US military pilot 
John Bryson, retired CEO of Edison International; 37th Secretary of Commerce
 Jeffrey Grayson, co-founder of Capital Consultants
 The Hudson Brothers, musical group and television act; recorded hit song "So You Are a Star"; all three brothers, including Bill Hudson (b. 1947), ex-husband of Goldie Hawn and father of Kate and Oliver Hudson
 Phil Knight, co-founder and chairman of Nike, Inc.
 Kathie L. Olsen, former Chief Scientist for NASA and deputy director, neuroscience, of the National Science Foundation
 Dennis Patera, former football player for the San Francisco 49ers
 Ken Patera, professional wrestler
 Jaime St. James, lead singer of Black 'N Blue and former lead singer of Warrant

Notes and references

Notes

References

1929 establishments in Oregon
Educational institutions established in 1929
High schools in Portland, Oregon
Hosford-Abernethy, Portland, Oregon
International Baccalaureate schools in Oregon
Portland Public Schools (Oregon)
Public high schools in Oregon